Émile Dauvet (25 March 1907 – 31 January 1925) was a French diver. He competed in the men's plain high diving event at the 1924 Summer Olympics.

References

External links
 

1907 births
1925 deaths
French male divers
Olympic divers of France
Divers at the 1924 Summer Olympics
Place of birth missing
20th-century French people